Trigonella falcata is a species of plant in the family Fabaceae. It is found only in Yemen. Its natural habitats are subtropical or tropical dry forests and rocky areas.

References

Trifolieae
Endemic flora of Socotra
Data deficient plants
Taxonomy articles created by Polbot
Taxa named by Isaac Bayley Balfour